Frank Kenneis Thornton (28 October 1898 – 8 September 1987) was an English cricketer.  Thornton was a right-handed batsman.  He was born at Leicester, Leicestershire.

Thornton made two first-class appearances for Northamptonshire in the 1937 County Championship against Essex and Lancashire.  In the match against Essex at the Town Ground, Peterborough, Thornton scored 13 runs in Northamptonshire's first-innings, before being dismissed by Stan Nichols, while in their second-innings he was dismissed by the same bowler for 9 runs.  In the match against Lancashire at the County Ground, Northampton, he scored a single run in Northamptonshire first-innings, before being dismissed by Dick Pollard, while in their second-innings he ended not out on 4.

He died at Fareham, Hampshire on 8 September 1987.  His brother John was also a first-class cricketer.

References

External links
Frank Thornton at ESPNcricinfo
Frank Thornton at CricketArchive

1898 births
1987 deaths
English cricketers
Northamptonshire cricketers
Cricketers from Leicester